Hardee is a surname. Notable people with the surname include:

 Gardner S. Hardee (1842–1926), Florida settler and state senator
Malcolm Hardee (1950–2005), British comedian and writer
Trey Hardee (born 1984), American decathlete
Wilber Hardee (1918-2008), founder of Hardee's
William J. Hardee (1815–1873), United States Army officer

See also
Hardee Kirkland (1868–1929), American silent film actor and director
Hardy (surname)
Hardie, surname